Dharmveer Prajapati (born 12 July 1963) is an Indian politician from the state of Uttar Pradesh. He is a member of Uttar Pradesh Legislative Council and Minister of State in the government of Uttar Pradesh, he has the department of Industrial Development assumed his office on 26 September 2021.

Posts Held

References 

1963 births
Living people
Members of the Uttar Pradesh Legislative Council
People from Hathras district